St. John in the wilderness is an Anglican church in India and is one of the oldest buildings in Nainital. The site was chosen and approved in 1844 by Bishop Daniel Wilson. The corner stone was laid in October 1846 and the plans were made by Captain Young at the cost of Rs 15,000 raised from private subscriptions and pew rents. Built in a Gothic style, it was inaugurated on 2 April 1848. A memorial in the church is to those killed in the 1880 landslip.

The cemetery in the church has graves from 1845 to around 1922 with the last burial being of Sir George Knox. The graves include those of the mother and father of Jim Corbett, Christopher William and Mary Jane Corbett who lived in nearby Gurney House.

References 

Anglican church buildings in India
Nainital
Churches in Uttarakhand
1848 establishments in India
Churches completed in 1848